Antti 'Anatomy' Aatamila (born June 22, 1982 in Ivalo, Finland) is a Finnish bassplayer in a glam-rock band Negative which he joined in the year 2000.

References

1982 births
Living people
Finnish bass guitarists
21st-century bass guitarists
21st-century Finnish male musicians